Methylprednisolone aceponate, or methylprednisolone acetate propionate, sold under the brand names Advantan and Avancort, is a glucocorticoid and a corticosteroid ester—specifically the C17α propionate and C21 acetate diester of methylprednisolone.

See also
 List of corticosteroid esters § Methylprednisolone esters

References

Corticosteroid esters
Corticosteroids
Propionate esters
Acetate esters